This Shit Is Genius is a 1999 album by punk rock band Dillinger Four. It collects material recorded from 1995-97 in their EPs of Higher Aspirations: Tempered and Dismantled, The Kids Are All Dead and The Rebel's Choice which is a split album with The Strike.

Track listing
 "Shotgun Confessional"
 "Unemployed"
 "Smells Like OK Soda"
 "One Trick Pony"
 "Open and Shut"
 "Sally MacLennane" (The Pogues)
 "I Coulda Been a Contender"
 "Hi-Pro Glow"
 "Two Cents"
 "He's a Shithead (Yeah, Yeah)"
 "Holy Shit"
 "Bite the Curb, Bite the Curb"
 "You're Not Blank" (The Dils)
 "Inquiring Minds (Should Read a Book)"

References

External links 

 

1999 compilation albums
Dillinger Four albums
No Idea Records albums